Arai Station may refer to one of the following railway stations in Japan:

 Arai Station (Hyōgo) (荒井駅)
 Arai Station (Miyagi) (荒井駅)
 Arai Station (Niigata) (新井駅)